Aleni Smith (born December 5, 1982) is a Samoan judoka. He competed in the men's 73 kg event at the 2012 Summer Olympics and was eliminated by Jaromír Ježek in the second round.

References

External links
 

1982 births
Living people
Samoan male judoka
Olympic judoka of Samoa
Judoka at the 2012 Summer Olympics
People from Vaisigano